Tetratheca pubescens is a species of flowering plant in the quandong family that is endemic to Australia.

Description
The species grows as a slender shrub to 60 cm in height. The flowers are white or pink-purple.

Distribution and habitat
The range of the species lies within the Esperance Plains, Jarrah Forest and Mallee IBRA bioregions of south-west Western Australia. The plants grow on rocky hillsides, in gullies and the banks of creeks, on sand, loam or clay soils.

References

pubescens
Eudicots of Western Australia
Oxalidales of Australia
Taxa named by Nikolai Turczaninow
Plants described in 1852